The Angst Stakes, registered as the Angst Quality Handicap, is an Australian Turf Club Group 3 Thoroughbred horse race for four-year-old mares and up, run at set weights with penalties, over a distance of 1600 metres at Randwick Racecourse, Sydney, Australia in October. The prize money for the event is A$200,000.

History
The race is named in honour of the 3 year old, grey filly named Angst. The winner of 7 races from 10 starts in 1993, including the Silver Shadow Stakes, Furious Stakes, Tea Rose Stakes and the Flight Stakes. The filly died the same year when undergoing a procedure to remove polyps from her larynx.

Name
1994–2004 - Angst Mares Quality Handicap
2005 onwards - Angst Stakes

Venue
2006–2010 - Randwick Racecourse
2011–2012 - Rosehill Racecourse
2013 onwards - Randwick Racecourse

Grade
1994–2012 - Listed race
2013 onwards - Group 3

Distance
1994–2011 - 1,400 metres
2012 - 1,500 metres
2013 onwards - 1,600 metres

Winners

 2022 - Hope In Your Heart 
 2021 - Mirra Vision 
 2020 - Emeralds 
 2019 - Nettoyer 
 2018 - I Am Serious
 2017 - Dixie Blossoms
 2016 - Dixie Blossoms
 2015 - Casino Dancer
 2014 - Neena Rock
 2013 - Sharnee Rose
 2012 - Nocturnelle
 2011 - Little Surfer Girl 
 2010 - Lovemelikearock
 2009 - Illuminates
 2008 - Neroli
 2007 - †race not held
 2006 - More Than Lucky
 2005 - Wild Queen
 2004 - Hennessy Waltz
 2003 - Zanna (NZ)
 2002 - Miss Zoe
 2001 - Danasia 
 2000 - Prenuptial
 1999 - Roseville
 1998 - Zalinda
 1997 - Stoneyfell Road 
 1996 - Rich Aunty
 1995 - Chlorophyll 
 1994 - Sky Watch

† Not held because of outbreak of equine influenza

See also
 List of Australian Group races
 Group races

References

Horse races in Australia